Kym L. Ragusa (born February 25, 1966) is an American writer and documentary filmmaker based in Brooklyn, New York.

Early life and education 
Ragusa was born in Manhattan, New York, to an Italian-American father and an African-American mother. Her paternal grandparents were immigrants from Messina; her maternal ancestors were brought to the United States as slaves. She spent much of her childhood living alternately with her maternal grandparents in Harlem and her paternal grandparents in Maplewood, New Jersey.

After attending public schools, Ragusa earned an M.A. in Media from the New School for Social Research. She also studied creative writing at Hunter College, where she was a student of Louise DeSalvo.

Career 

Ragusa directed two award-winning short documentary films, Passing (1995) and Fuori/Outside (1997). Her other films include Demarcations, Threads of Memory, and Remembering the Triangle Fire.

Her memoir, The Skin Between Us: A Memoir of Race, Beauty, and Belonging (W. W. Norton & Co., 2006), was a finalist for the 2007 Hurston-Wright Legacy Award for nonfiction, and has been well received by critics. An Italian-language edition, La pelle che ci separa, was published in 2008. Her writing has also appeared in anthologies, such as The Milk of Almonds: Italian American Women Writers on Food and Culture (2003), Personal Effects: Essays on Memoir, Teaching, and Culture in the Work of Louise DeSalvo (2014), and Are Italians White? How Race is Made in America (2012).

Much of Ragusa's artistic work explores themes of racial identity and belonging. In the foreword to Olive Grrrls: Italian North American Women & The Search For Identity (2013), Ragusa describes her uneasiness with pat answers to the question, "What are you?" and concludes that "No identity is singular, clear-cut, fixed; each is situated in histories and in daily lives that are endlessly complex."

Ragusa has taught Writing and Film Studies at Eugene Lang College and the City University of New York.

Awards 
 1995: Juror's Prize, Women in the Director's Chair, for Passing
 1997: Best Video, South Bronx Film and Video Festival, for Fuori/Outside
 1999: New York Foundation for the Arts film fellowship
 2007: Hurston-Wright Legacy Award finalist for The Skin Between Us

References

Further reading 
 
 
 Perez, Hiram. "'It's Just Dark Outside': Kym Ragusa's Memoirs of White Flight". Paper presented at the annual meeting of the American Studies Association, October 12, 2006.

External links 
 

Living people
1966 births
21st-century American women writers
American writers of Italian descent
African-American non-fiction writers
American documentary film directors
African-American film directors
Writers from Brooklyn
People from Maplewood, New Jersey
People from Harlem
The New School alumni
Hunter College alumni
Film directors from New York City
Film directors from New Jersey
American women documentary filmmakers
21st-century African-American women writers
21st-century African-American writers
20th-century African-American people
20th-century African-American women
American people of Italian descent